Pyryayevo is a rural locality (a village) in Sizemskoye Rural Settlement, Sheksninsky District, Vologda Oblast, Russia. The population was 12 as of 2002.

Geography 
Pyryayevo is located 68 km north of Sheksna (the district's administrative centre) by road. Vskhody is the nearest rural locality.

References 

Rural localities in Sheksninsky District